Gene Patterson may refer to:

Eugene Patterson (1923–2013), American journalist and civil rights activist
Colt Cobra, stage name of Gene Patterson, American professional driver of "Snake Bite"; see Bigfoot
Gene Patterson, American broadcast news journalist; see WATE-TV

See also
Patterson (disambiguation)